The Apollo Delta Jet is a Hungarian ultralight trike, designed and produced by Apollo Ultralight Aircraft of Eger. The aircraft is supplied as a kit for amateur construction or as a complete ready-to-fly-aircraft.

Design and development
The aircraft was designed to comply with the Fédération Aéronautique Internationale microlight category and the US light-sport aircraft category. It features a cable-braced or strut-braced hang glider-style high-wing, weight-shift controls, a two-seats-in-tandem, open cockpit, tricycle landing gear with wheel pants and a single engine in pusher configuration.

The Delta Jet is accepted in the United States as both an Experimental and Special Light-sport aircraft.

The aircraft is made from bolted-together aluminum tubing, with its double surface wing covered in Dacron sailcloth. The aircraft uses an "A" frame weight-shift control bar. The powerplant options include the twin cylinder, liquid-cooled, two-stroke, dual-ignition  Rotax 582 engine, the four cylinder, air and liquid-cooled, four-stroke, dual-ignition  Rotax 912 or  Rotax 912S engine.

A number of different wings can be fitted to the basic carriage, including the cable-braced Aeros Profi, the strut-braced Aeros Profi TL and the Apollo Reflex 11 or 13.

Variants
Delta Jet
Base model with an empty weight of 
Delta Jet AS-III
Equipped model with an empty weight of 
Delta Jet 2
Improved and fully equipped model

Specifications (AS-III)

References

External links

2000s Hungarian sport aircraft
2000s Hungarian ultralight aircraft
Light-sport aircraft
Single-engined pusher aircraft
Ultralight trikes
Apollo Ultralight Aircraft aircraft